The Last Innocents: The Collision of the Turbulent Sixties and the Los Angeles Dodgers is a book by Michael Leahy, published in 2016, about the famed baseball team, the Los Angeles Dodgers, led by iconic pitcher Sandy Koufax. It examines the tumultuous political and social change, paranoia and racism of the 1960s through the lens of the players themselves. The book was the winner of the 2016 Casey Award and nominee finalist for the 2017 PEN/ESPN Award for Literary Sports Writing.

Main player subjects

Maury Wills
Sandy Koufax
Wes Parker
Jeff Torborg
Dick Tracewski
Lou Johnson
Tommy Davis

Notable figures
Walter O'Malley
Buzzie Bavasi
Vin Scully

Awards and recognition

Michael Leahy was awarded the 2016 Casey Award for The Last Innocents.

The book was nominated as a finalist for the 2017 PEN/ESPN Award for Literary Sports Writing.

On July 12, 2017, Leahy was invited to speak at the Baseball Hall of Fame to discuss The Last Innocents and its background.

References

External links
 

2016 non-fiction books
Baseball books
Major League Baseball books
1960s
1960s in sports
1960s in politics
Los Angeles Dodgers
HarperCollins books